Henry Van Der Lyn or Henry Vanderlyn (hen'ree văn'durlin) (April 24, 1784 – October 1, 1865) was a 19th-century American lawyer, from Oxford, New York.

Bibliography
Henry Vanderlyn was the grandson of Pieter Vanderlyn (c.1687–1778) an American colonial painter born in Holland who settled in Kingston, New York. Henry was the brother of John Vanderlyn (1775–1852) a well known Neoclassical painter.

Henry Vanderlyn is one of the most engaging individuals in Oxford, New York's history. He moved to Oxford in 1806 and established a law practice after earning his bachelor's degree at Union College and serving in a New York City law office where he was admitted to the Bar association.

Vanderlyn was a very popular person in Oxford for his genial personality and his generous support of the Oxford Academy School.

He made daily notes on life in Oxford and kept a diary of local and personal events. This diary is a window into the formative years in Chenango County, New York during the first half of the 19th century.

One of the Oxford Historical Society (OHS) museum's most prized items is a set of six volumes of these diaries covering the years 1827-1853. The original hand written diary is in the New York State Historical Society.

1784 births
1865 deaths
American diarists
People from Oxford, New York
19th-century American lawyers